American Anthem is a 1986 American sports drama film directed by Albert Magnoli and starring Mitch Gaylord and Janet Jones. The film was produced by Lorimar Motion Pictures and released in North America by Columbia Pictures.

Plot
Football player turned gymnast Steve Tevere seeks to join the United States Olympic gymnastics team. Gaylord was a member of the gold-medal U.S. men's gymnastics team at the 1984 Summer Olympics.

Cast
 Mitch Gaylord as Steve Tevere
 Tiny Wells as Jake
 Janet Jones as Julie Lloyd
 Michael Pataki as Coach Soranhoff
 Patrice Donnelly as Danielle
 R.J. Williams as Mikey Tevere
 John Aprea as Mr. Tevere
 Michelle Phillips as Linda Tevere
 Kathrine Godney as Landlady
 Stacy Maloney as Kirk Baker
 Peter Tramm as Ron Denver
 Maria Anz as Becky Cameron
 Jenny Ester as Tracy Prescott
 Andrew White as Arthur
 Dick McGarvin as Announcer Prelim Meet
 Mark Oates as Danny Squire
 Jan Claire as Announcer Final Meet
 Megan Marsden as Jo-Ellen Carter
 Li Yuejiu as Lin Xiang
 Googy Gress as Alan Cole

Soundtrack

The soundtrack was released on CD, LP and cassette by Atlantic Records. The album contains songs by various artists, including two themes from the film, composed and conducted by Alan Silvestri.

 Two Hearts - John Parr (6:07)
 Run to Her - Mr. Mister (3:34)
 Same Direction - INXS (5:08)
 Battle of the Dragon - Stevie Nicks (5:15)
 Wings to Fly - Graham Nash (4:00)
 Take It Easy - Andy Taylor (4:22)
 Wings of Love - Andy Taylor (5:03)
 Love and Loneliness - Chris Thompson (5:03)
 Angel Eyes - Andy Taylor (3:26)
 Arthur's Theme - Alan Silvestri (2:50)
 Julie's Theme - Alan Silvestri (1:42)

Reception

The film was a box office flop, grossing only $4.8 million against a $7 million budget.

The film received aggressively negative reviews by critics, especially from famed critics Gene Siskel and Roger Ebert; with the latter saying the film was "as bad as any movie I've seen [in 1986], and so inept that not even the gymnastics scenes are interesting" and the former calling the film "complete junk; you can see more interesting gymnastics on Wide World of Sports than in this garbage". Ebert opened his print review by writing:  Patrick Goldstein of the Los Angeles Times remarked: 

American Anthem currently holds a 0% rating on Rotten Tomatoes based on sixteen reviews, with an average rating of 2.5/10. Audiences polled by CinemaScore gave the film an average grade of "B-" on an A+ to F scale.

Accolades
Gaylord's performance in the film earned him a Razzie Award nomination for Worst New Star, where he lost to "the six guys and gals in the duck suit" from Howard the Duck.

References

External links
 
 
 

Gymnastics films
Films about the 1984 Summer Olympics
Films about Olympic gymnastics
1986 films
Albums produced by Roy Thomas Baker
1980s English-language films
1980s sports drama films
Films scored by Alan Silvestri
American sports drama films
Films directed by Albert Magnoli
Columbia Pictures films
1986 drama films
1980s American films